Tricon Garage (with Tricon styled in all-capital letters), formerly known as David Gilliland Racing and Team DGR, is an American professional stock car racing team that competes in the NASCAR Craftsman Truck Series, the ARCA Menards Series, the ARCA Menards Series East, the ARCA Menards Series West, and the CARS Tour. The team was founded in early 2017 when racing team owners David Gilliland and Bo LeMastus came together to form a collaborative effort from their respective teams, David Gilliland Racing and Crosley Sports Group, known as DGR-Crosley. DGR-Crosley fielded Toyotas in 2018 and 2019 before announcing its switch to Ford starting in 2020. The team reverted to the David Gilliland Racing name in 2021 as Johnny Gray became a co-owner. Former co-owner and driver Bo LeMastus remained with the team in a marketing and sponsorship capacity.

On October 27, 2022, the team announced that they would be moving to Toyota Racing Development in 2023 and would rename the team TRICON Garage. The new name is said to be derived from the prefix tri- and the word icon.

History

Camping World Truck Series

Truck No. 1 history

Hailie Deegan (2021–2022)
On January 18, 2021, it was announced that Hailie Deegan would pilot the No. 1 truck in her rookie season. Deegan would return to run a second season in 2022.

Multiple drivers (2023–Present)
On October 27, 2022, it was announced that with the move to Toyota in 2023, various Toyota drivers would take the seat.

Truck No. 1 results

Truck No. 5 history
Dylan Lupton (2019)
In June 2019, DGR-Crosley formed the No. 5 team for a five-race schedule with Dylan Lupton starting at Chicagoland Speedway.

Dean Thompson (2023-Present)
On December 5, 2022, Tricon Garage announced that Dean Thompson will drive for the team in the No. 5 Truck full time in 2023

Truck No. 5 results

Truck No. 7 history
Tanner Gray (2019)
DGR-Crosley ran the No. 7 truck for Tanner Gray for the last two races of the 2019 season. 

Truck No. 7 results

Truck No. 11 history 
Corey Heim (2023-Present)
Corey Heim was announced as the full-time driver for the new No. 11 entry on October 27, 2022, for the 2023 season with sponsorship coming from Safelite, JBL and SiriusXM.

Truck No. 15 history

Multiple drivers (2019)
DGR-Crosley began running the 15 part-time for Anthony Alfredo starting at Las Vegas Motor Speedway in 2019. Alfredo got his first career top 10 in the truck at Charlotte Motor Speedway.

Tanner Gray (2020–present)
On December 26, 2019, it was announced the No. 15 team will run full-time in 2020 with Tanner Gray behind the wheel. Gray scored four top 5 finishes and ended his rookie season 17th in points.

Truck No. 15 results

Truck No. 17 history

Multiple drivers (2018–2022)
On January 22, 2018, it was announced that David Gilliland Racing and Crosley Sports Group would merge into one team and join the Truck Series part-time. The team had purchased Red Horse Racing's assets. Chris Eggleston was announced as the driver beginning at Charlotte for a limited schedule. However, with the threat of rain before the Charlotte race, Eggleston moved to the primary 54 truck for the race and team co-owner Bo LeMastus shifted to the 17, which had no owner points. Qualifying was rained out, and LeMastus missed the race.

On December 14, 2018, it was announced that Tyler Ankrum will compete full-time in the No. 17 competing for Rookie of the Year honors in 2019. He will miss the first three races due to age restrictions but run all the races after that. On February 20, 2019, it was announced that Ryan Reed will drive the No. 17 Toyota at the Strat 200 at Las Vegas. On July 11, 2019, Ankrum scored his first Truck Series win at Kentucky after Brett Moffitt ran out of fuel towards the final lap. This also marked DGR-Crosley's first Truck Series win. In 2020, Hailie Deegan made her Truck series debut at Kansas Speedway. In 2021, Taylor Gray was scheduled to drive at the ToyotaCare 250, but he suffered multiple fractures in a single-car accident. That same year Donny Schatz would make his debut at the Corn Belt Weekend. Ryan Preece won at Nashville Superspeedway in his Truck Series debut. Preece would win again at Nashville in 2022.

Taylor Gray (2023–Present)
Taylor Gray was announced as a TRD development driver on October 27, 2022. He was announced that he would be driving to No. 17 starting at Circuit of the Americas due to him not being old enough to run the first three races of the season.

Truck No. 17 results

Truck No. 54 history

LeMastus made his Truck Series debut in the No. 54 at Daytona, getting caught up in a wreck. Various other drivers have run in this truck throughout the 2018 season, including Kyle Benjamin who finished second at Martinsville, Justin Marks at Las Vegas, and team co-owner David Gilliland. Tyler Ankrum made his Truck Series Debut at Martinsville Speedway after winning the K&N East Championship for DGR.

The No. 54 was driven by Natalie Decker, Anthony Alfredo, David Gilliland, Kyle Strickler, and Raphaël Lessard in 2019. Decker finished 19th, Alfredo 22nd, Lessard 32nd, Gilliland 47th, and Strickler 63rd in the points standings.

The No. 54 later returned to 2022 with Joey Logano as depicted by a report.

Truck No. 54 results

ARCA Menards Series

Car No. 4 history
On December 17, 2019, DGR-Crosley announced Hailie Deegan as the driver of the No. 4 Ford Fusion for the 2020 ARCA Menards Series season.

Car No. 17 history
In 2020, DGR-Crosley field the No. 17 Ford Fusion full-time for Tanner Gray and his brother Taylor Gray along with Dylan Lupton and Anthony Alfredo.

On March 8, 2022 a hauler carrying the car on its way to Phoenix Raceway collided with a Honda Passport near Longview, Texas, killing hauler driver Steven C. Stotts. Two passengers in the hauler and the driver of the SUV survived the accident. Three days later on March 11, Gray won the General Tire 150 after starting second and leading 43 laps, dedicating the win to Stotts.

Car No. 46 history
In 2020, it was announced that Thad Moffitt would drive the No. 46 for the season-opening race at Daytona, and would then run all races on the schedule until sponsorship dried up, plus Memphis, which the team had previously signed a sponsor for. He claimed three top-five finishes over thirteen races, with a career-best finish of fourth at Memphis.

In 2021, it was announced that Moffitt would return to this car for at least eleven races.

Car No. 54 history
In 2018, Noah Gragson was named as the first driver of the No. 54 and drove the entry in the Lucas Oil 200 at Daytona, finishing in 7th place. Gragson, Todd Gilliland and Bo LeMastus all made starts in the car during 2018.

ARCA Menards Series East

Car No. 1 history
Derek Kraus debuted the car at New Hampshire Motor Speedway in late 2018, finishing second. He returned for the season finale at Dover International Speedway.

Car No. 4 history
Hailie Deegan drove the No. 4 car at Toledo and Bristol in 2020.

Car No. 15 history
Tanner Gray drove the No. 15 car full-time in 2019. He got his first career win at South Boston Speedway and finished third in the standings.

Car No. 17 history
The No. 17 debuted at the beginning of 2018 with Tyler Ankrum, who finished in fifth place at New Smyrna Speedway. Ankrum won four races in 2018; victories came at South Boston Speedway, Thompson Speedway, Iowa Speedway and New Hampshire Motor Speedway. Ankrum clinched the championship with one race remaining ahead of Tyler Dippel.

In 2019, DGR-Crosley fielded the No. 17 part-time for various drivers including Ty Gibbs and Riley Herbst. On September 21, Gibbs scored his first career win at the Apple Barrel 125 at New Hampshire Motor Speedway.

Car No. 20 history
Cup regular Erik Jones drove a car for the team at Watkins Glen in 2018.

Car No. 46 history
Thad Moffitt drove the No. 46 car at Iowa, Milwaukee, and Bristol in 2021.

Car No. 54 history
Todd Gilliland ran the No. 54 at the 2018 New Smyrna 175, scoring DGR-Crosley's first victory with a last lap pass on Harrison Burton. Noah Gragson ran the following race at Bristol Motor Speedway. Tyler Dippel then joined the team, winning the following race at Langley Speedway. After a tumultuous season which included intentionally spinning teammate and eventual champion Tyler Ankrum at New Jersey Motorsports Park, Dippel left the car after the season's penultimate race and Todd Gilliland endcapped the season in the car.

In 2019, Legends car driver Drew Dollar drove the car full-time.

Car No. 98 history
Todd Gilliland ran this car in 2018 at Bristol Motor Speedway, leading the most laps and winning the race. Noah Gragson ran the 98 at Watkins Glen.

Natalie Decker ran the 98 in 2019 at Bristol Motor Speedway.

ARCA Menards Series West

Car No. 4 history
Team owner David Gilliland drove this car in 2020 at Phoenix Raceway and won.

Car No. 15 history
The No. 15 will be run in select events for Tanner Gray. After skipping the first race, Gray has finished runner-up in all 3 starts.

Car No. 17 history
The No. 17 run 5 races with Taylor Gray in 2020. Gray won once at Kern County Raceway Park.

Car No. 20 history
The No. 20 debuted at the 2018 Carneros 200 at Sonoma Raceway driven by NASCAR Cup Series driver Erik Jones with sponsorship from Dewalt.

Car No. 45 history
Jake Garcia drove the No. 45 car at the General Tire 150
at Phoenix Raceway in 2021.

Car No. 46 history
The No. 46 car debuted at the General Tire 150 at Phoenix Raceway driven by Thad Moffitt, later at the second Phoenix race next year with J.P. Bergeron.

Car No. 54 history
The No. 54 debuted at the 2018 Carneros 200 at Sonoma Raceway driven by NASCAR Cup Series driver Daniel Suárez with sponsorship from Arris.

Car No. 71 history
Taylor Gray drove the No. 71 car at the General Tire 150
at Phoenix Raceway in 2021.

Late model racing
David Gilliland Racing debuted in 2014 in the X-1R Pro Cup Series, the predecessor to the CARS Tour, fielding the No. 98 for Todd Gilliland. From 2015 to 2017 DGR ran Super Late Models, fielding multiple cars for multiple drivers including; Todd Gilliland, Raphael Lessard, Nicole Behar, Alex Guenette, Anthony Anders, Tanner Thorson, Chase Purdy, and Hannah Newhouse.

DGR decided not to run Super Late Models in 2018 due to their transition to DGR-Crosley and their entry into the Truck Series and ARCA Menards Series, they switched to fielding late models starting in 2019.

Taylor Gray and Drew Dollar were late model drivers for the team in 2019. Taylor Gray drove part-time in the CARS Tour in 2020 picking up a win in the opening round. Joe Valento will run the full season for DGR in the CARS Tour in 2021.

References

External links
 
  (David Gilliland)
  (Bo LeMastus)

2018 establishments in North Carolina
NASCAR teams